Calyptocephala gerstaeckeri is a species of tortoise beetles in the genus Calyptocephala.

Distribution 
This species can be found in Central America.

References 

Beetles of Central America
Beetles described in 1862
Cassidinae